Timothy Charles Baker (born October 23, 1977) is a former professional American football wide receiver in the National Football League (NFL).

External links
Texas Tech Red Raiders bio

References

1977 births
Living people
Sportspeople from Amarillo, Texas
Players of American football from Texas
American football wide receivers
Texas Tech Red Raiders football players
Pittsburgh Steelers players
San Diego Chargers players